Admission is a 2013 American romantic comedy-drama film directed by Paul Weitz and starring Tina Fey and Paul Rudd. The film was released in the United States and Canada on March 22, 2013. It is an adaptation of Jean Hanff Korelitz's 2009 novel of the same name.

Plot
Straight-laced Princeton University Admissions Officer Portia Nathan is caught off guard while making a recruiting visit to an alternative high school overseen by a former college classmate, the free-wheeling John Pressman. With vast experience in the coaching, consoling, and criticism involving Princeton's admission, she pays a visit to the Quest School, where John teaches while raising an adopted son. After exposing Portia to outspoken Quest students' impressions of college, he takes her to meet the rather unconventional Jeremiah Balakian, a child prodigy.

Back on campus, Portia's longtime boyfriend Mark breaks up with her after impregnating a "Virginia Woolf scholar" named Helen. After an awkward romantic attraction to Pressman, she arranges for Jeremiah to visit Princeton, where she and a colleague, Corinne, are rivals to succeed the soon-to-retire Dean of Admissions.

Portia long ago had a secret pregnancy, putting the baby up for adoption, and is shown apparent proof by Pressman that Jeremiah is hers.  Although he is brilliant, Jeremiah's miserable transcript results in his being deemed unfit to attend the University. Portia, in an act that greatly endangers her position, schemes to gain Jeremiah entrance into the school, knowing that Princeton cannot reveal such a scandal.

Her resignation is demanded. Later, when revealing to Jeremiah that she is his biological mother, she finds out that there was a photocopy mistake on his birth certificate and that the boy has already located his actual biological mother. Portia appears at the Adoption Agency, trying to locate her son, where she describes her life with a different perspective. When asked how would she feel to meet her actual child, she replies that she would feel "nervous, but lucky."

In the end, now dating Pressman, she receives a letter about her son, which says he is not ready to meet her yet. Pressman points out to her that she is on the waitlist "... and that's not so bad."

Cast
 Tina Fey as Portia Nathan
 Paul Rudd as John Pressman
 Michael Sheen as Mark
 Lily Tomlin as Susannah
 Wallace Shawn as Clarence
 Nat Wolff as Jeremiah Balakian
 Gloria Reuben as Corinne
 Travaris Spears as Nelson
 Christopher Evan Welch as Brandt
 Sonya Walger as Helen
 Leigha Hancock as Yulia Karasov
 Dan Levy as James

Production
The film was directed by Paul Weitz, known for his work on About a Boy, and was based on the novel of the same name by Jean Hanff Korelitz. The film was shot both at the Princeton University campus and at Manhattanville College in Purchase, New York. A trailer for the film was released on November 20, 2012. The film was released on March 22, 2013. Admission was the first major motion picture to use RushTera for post-production collaboration.

Reception
Admission received mixed reviews from critics. On review aggregator website Rotten Tomatoes, it holds an approval rating of 39% based on 158 reviews, with a weighted average of 5.50/10. The site's consensus reads: "Admission has a pair of immensely likable leads in Tina Fey and Paul Rudd, but it wastes them on a contrived (and clumsily directed) screenplay". Metacritic gives an average score of 48% based on 39 reviews, indicating "mixed or average reviews".

References

External links
 
 
 
 
 

2013 films
2013 comedy-drama films
2013 romantic comedy-drama films
American romantic comedy-drama films
Films about adoption
Films about dysfunctional families
Films about infidelity
Films based on American novels
Films directed by Paul Weitz
Films scored by Stephen Trask
Films set in New Jersey
Films shot in New Jersey
Films shot in New York (state)
Focus Features films
Princeton University
Films set in universities and colleges
2010s English-language films
2010s American films